Chris Hubert (born May 8, 1993) is an American football wide receiver who is currently a free agent. He played college football at Fayetteville State University. Hubert was signed by the Arizona Cardinals as an undrafted free agent in 2016.

Professional career

After going undrafted in the 2016 NFL Draft, Hubert signed with the Arizona Cardinals on May 9, 2016. On September 3, 2016, he was waived and was signed to the practice squad on September 12, 2016. On October 26, 2016, he was promoted from the practice squad to active roster. On January 3, 2017, Hubert signed a future contract with the Cardinals.

On May 10, 2017, he was released by the Cardinals. He was re-signed on June 6, 2017. He was waived on September 2, 2017.

References

External links
 Fayetteville State University bio
 Arizona Cardinals bio

1993 births
Living people
Players of American football from Raleigh, North Carolina
American football wide receivers
Fayetteville State Broncos football players
Arizona Cardinals players
People from Cary, North Carolina